Chamerevo is a rural locality (a selo) in Lavrovskoye Rural Settlement, Sudogodsky District, Vladimir Oblast, Russia. The population was 572 as of 2010. There are 13 streets.

Geography 
Chamerevo is located on the right bank of the Voyninga River, 15 km north of Sudogda (the district's administrative centre) by road. Slashchyovo is the nearest rural locality.

References 

Rural localities in Sudogodsky District
Sudogodsky Uyezd